E Flat Boogie is a compilation album released in 2000 by the Washington, D.C.-based go-go band Trouble Funk. The album consists of a compilations of the band earlier singles from the late-70s to the early-80s.

Track listing

Personnel
 Chester "T-Bone" Davis – electric guitar
 Tony Fisher – lead vocals, bass guitar
 Bootsy Collins – bass guitar, drums, electric guitar, keyboard
 Emmett Nixon – drums
 James Avery – keyboards
 Robert Reed – keyboards
 Mack Carey – percussions, congas
 Timothy David – percussions, congas
 David Rudd – tenor saxophone
 Gerald Reed – trombone
 Taylor Reed – trombone, trumpet

References

External links
 E Flat Boogie at Discogs

2000 compilation albums
Trouble Funk albums